Diplacodes is a genus of dragonflies in the Libellulidae family. 
They are commonly known as perchers. Their colours range from the totally black body of the African Diplacodes lefebvrii, the lovely pale blue of India's Diplacodes trivialis, to the intense red of the Asian–Australian Diplacodes haematodes.

Various species of this genus occur in Africa, Asia, Australia and the South West Pacific. They are generally small in size.

Species
The genus Diplacodes includes the following species:

References

Libellulidae
Anisoptera genera
Odonata of Africa
Odonata of Asia
Odonata of Australia
Odonata of Oceania
Taxa named by William Forsell Kirby
Insects described in 1889